The Centre for Excellence in Mining Innovation (CEMI) is a Canadian mining industry research initiative, collaboratively funded by the private sector and government. CEMI was established in 2007, as a not for profit corporation. CEMI's focused research is in hardrock underground mining.

History
In November 2003 the Ontario Government by way of the Ontario Mineral Industry Cluster Council (OMICC) started to develop a "cluster approach" for the mineral resources industry within Ontario. This approach involved bringing together key stakeholders from Ontario's mineral sector-related industries, organizations, and government agencies.  In 2006 the initial seed funding was provided by Vale Inco ($5 million), Xstrata ($5 million), Ontario Government ($10 million) and the City of Greater Sudbury ($50,000) in a combination of cash and in-kind contributions over the following three years.  In 2007 CEMI was formally established as a not for profit corporation.

References

Non-profit organizations based in Ontario
Organizations based in Greater Sudbury
Mining organizations
Mining in Canada
2007 establishments in Ontario